Melocactus intortus, also known as the Turk's cap cactus, is a species of cactus endemic to the Caribbean.

Etymology
The Turks Islands in the Turks and Caicos are named after this cactus, whose red cephalium resembles the fez worn by Turkish men in the late Ottoman Empire.  A stylised version of the cactus appears prominently on the coat of arms of the Turks and Caicos Islands.

References

intortus
Flora of the Caribbean